Atsu is a town and a Nagar panchayat in Auraiya district in the state of Uttar Pradesh, India.

Demographics
As of the 2001 Census of India, Atasu had a population of 10,602. Males constitute 54% of the population and females 46%. Atasu has an average literacy rate of 66%, higher than the national average of 59.5%; with 61% of the males and 39% of females literate. 17% of the population is under 6 years of age. 
Educational hubs: Kishan mahaviddyalaya, Sarasvati Vidya mandir and others
Technical Education: recently in 2012 a Polytechnic college has been started 
Medical: No hospital available but there are medical stores
Transportation- town resides to the road of Babarpur Phapund, away 24 km from Phapund and 4 km from Bararpur, most of the type of road transport is available, but only up to 8:00 PM

References

Cities and towns in Auraiya district